Homer is an extinct town in Union County, in the U.S. state of Ohio.

History
Homer was platted in 1834, and for a time its prospects were considered good, but the town had declined by around 1840. By the 1880s, Homer was already a ghost town.

References

Geography of Union County, Ohio
Ghost towns in Ohio